Cummings C. Chesney (Selinsgrove, Pennsylvania, October 28, 1863 – November 27, 1947) was an electrical engineer who made major contributions to alternating current power systems.

References
IEEE History Site Cummings C. Chesney
Hall of History Biography

1863 births
1947 deaths
American electrical engineers
IEEE Edison Medal recipients
People from Selinsgrove, Pennsylvania
Engineers from Pennsylvania